Rodd & Gunn (Rodd and Gunn) is a New Zealand manufacturer of clothing footwear and accessories. It was founded in 1946 in New Zealand by Jim Jarvis.  By 1995, the label had been acquired by the Australian firm Action Downunder.  The firm outfitted the New Zealand national team participating in the 2012 London Summer Olympics.

References

External links

Clothing companies established in 1946
Clothing companies of New Zealand
Clothing retailers of New Zealand
New Zealand companies established in 1946